Porphyrobaphe iostoma is a species of land snail, a terrestrial pulmonate gastropod mollusk in the family Orthalicidae.

Description

Distribution
This species is found in Ecuador.

References 

Orthalicidae
Gastropods described in 1824